David Raphael Moscow (born November 14, 1974) is an American actor, producer and activist. He is best known for his role as the young Josh Baskin in the 1988 film Big and as David in the 1992 musical film Newsies.

Career

In 1988, Moscow played the young Josh Baskin in Big, in which his character was magically transformed into an adult played by Tom Hanks. Moscow landed the role of David Jacobs in the 1992 filmed version of the musical Newsies, co-starring opposite Christian Bale. Moscow also appears in a leading role opposite Jessica Alba in the film Honey and has starred on several network television series including Zoe, Duncan, Jack & Jane. He was also featured on the television series Seinfeld as the character Lomez Jr in the episode "The Van Buren Boys".

He has also appeared in leading roles on Broadway, including Artie in the production What's Wrong with This Picture at the Brooks Atkinson Theatre. Moscow ran A Theater Co. in New York alongside actors Tom Everett Scott and Michael Kelly.

Moscow also co-developed and co-produced Lin-Manuel Miranda's first production of In the Heights with his ex-fiance, actress Kerry Washington.

As a producer, his 2012 project, Hellbenders, was acquired by Lionsgate for North American and foreign distribution; and his film, the psychological thriller Desolation, was his directorial debut and was partially funded by a successful Kickstarter campaign. Desolation has already been screened and honored at film festivals around the world including the Wroclaw Festival in Poland. Recent producing projects include Sylvio, The Jingoist, Blind, Easy Living and Thirst Street. He launched a Kickstarter campaign to help fund post-production with a video reenactment of the Zoltar "wish" scene from Big. The campaign raised more than $70,000.

Moscow has a long history as an activist, which began in 1992 after dropping out of college to track wolves for the Round River Conservations Studies. He also built a mixed income green housing facility in Harlem in 2006. In 2007, the magazine Time Out New York reported Moscow's involvement in developing sustainable and economic housing in Harlem.

Personal life
Moscow was born in The Bronx, the son of Patricia (née Sterner) and Jon Moscow. His mother's family is from Montana. His father is Jewish, and his mother is Mormon, but he was not raised in either religion.

His younger brother Lev was an extra in Newsies and is a history teacher at The Beacon School in New York City. Moscow is friends with Max Casella and Luke Edwards from Newsies. 

Moscow attended Hampshire College in Amherst, Massachusetts, in the 1990s. Moscow was engaged to actress Kerry Washington from October 2004 to March 2007.

Filmography
I'll be Home for Christmas (1988) — David Bundy
The Wizard of Loneliness (1988) — Jimmy Wiggen
Big (1988) — Young Josh Baskin
Live-In (1989) (television series) — Peter Matthews
Living Dolls (1989) (television series) — Rick Carlin
Newsies (1992) — David Jacobs
White Wolves: A Cry in the Wild II (1993) — Adam
River Red (1998) — Tom Holden
Hurricane Streets (1998) — Shane
Girl (1998) — Greg
Side Streets (1999) — Bellboy
Restaurant (1998) — Reggae
Zoe, Duncan, Jack & Jane (1999) (television series) — Duncan Milch
Loving Jezebel (2000) — Gabe Parks
Riding in Cars with Boys (2001) — Lizard Hasek
Just Married (2003) — Kyle
Honey (2003) — Michael Ellis
Nearing Grace (2005) — Blair Nearing
Looking for Palladin (2008) — Josh Ross
David & Layla (2007) — David Fine
The End of America (2008) — Executive producer
Turn Me On Dead Man (2008) — John
Dead Air (2008) — Gil
The Promotion (2008) - Painter
Vacancy 2: The First Cut (2009) — Gordon

References

External links
 

1974 births
20th-century American male actors
21st-century American male actors
Male actors from New York City
American male child actors
American male film actors
American male television actors
Hampshire College alumni
Living people
People from the Bronx
American people of Jewish descent